Stoddard Judd (May 18, 1797March 2, 1873) was an American physician, politician, and Wisconsin pioneer.  He served 4 years in the Wisconsin Legislature, representing Dodge County.  Earlier, he served three terms in the New York State Assembly.

Biography
Born in Sharon, Connecticut, Judd graduated from Albany Medical College and practiced medicine in Dutchess County, New York. In 1829, 1835, and 1836, Judd served in the New York State Legislature. Then, in 1841, President William Henry Harrison appointed Judd land receiver in Green Bay, Wisconsin Territory. He moved to Fox Lake, Wisconsin in 1845. Judd was also involved in the railroad business, serving as president of the La Crosse Railroad. He served the first and second Wisconsin Constitutional Conventions of 1846 and 1847–1848. Judd was a Democrat, but he backed the Republican candidate, John C. Frémont, in the 1856 election. Judd also served in the Wisconsin State Assembly in 1860 and in the Wisconsin State Senate in 1866 and 1867, at which point he was the oldest member of the senate (at age 69). He died in Fox Lake, Wisconsin on March 2, 1873.

Notes

External links

1797 births
1873 deaths
People from Sharon, Connecticut
People from Dutchess County, New York
People from Fox Lake, Wisconsin
Politicians from Green Bay, Wisconsin
Businesspeople from Wisconsin
Physicians from New York (state)
Physicians from Wisconsin
Members of the New York State Assembly
Members of the Wisconsin State Assembly
Wisconsin state senators
19th-century American politicians
19th-century American businesspeople